The Council of Mortgage Lenders was an industry body representing mortgage lenders in the United Kingdom.

Its members consisted of banks, building societies and specialist lenders and represented 95% of mortgage lending in the UK.

In November 2015 it was confirmed that the Council of Mortgage Lenders would be merged with the British Bankers' Association, Payments UK, the UK Cards Association and the Asset Based Finance Association, following a review into financial trade bodies. It became part of the newly established UK Finance in July 2017.

References

External links 
 

Mortgage industry of the United Kingdom
Housing in the United Kingdom
Business organisations based in the United Kingdom
Mortgage industry associations